The Dognapper is a 1934 animated short film produced by Walt Disney Productions and released by United Artists. The cartoon stars Mickey Mouse and Donald Duck as police officers who chase Pegleg Pete after he dognaps Fifi, Minnie Mouse's pet Pekingese. The film was directed by David Hand and features the voices of Clarence Nash as Mickey and Donald. Pinto Colvig as Pete and Melvin J. Gibby as Fifi. It was the 70th Mickey Mouse short film to be released, and the eighth of that year. This was the first and only time that Mickey was voiced by Nash; Walt was in Europe at the time and was unavailable to record his lines for Mickey, thus, Nash took over.

The Dognapper was Donald's third film and was the first adventure story to feature both Mickey and Donald. This was the second of only three B&W cartoons to feature Donald Duck (the other two being Orphan's Benefit and Mickey's Service Station). Because the color of Donald's feet does not show in black and white, his feet were black in these cartoons.

Plot

The plot is introduced in newspaper headlines that Fifi, Minnie Mouse's pekingese, has been dognapped, along with a description of the suspect, Peg Leg Pete. A radio transmission detailing the suspect's get-away car is heard by police officer Mickey Mouse and his sidekick Donald Duck. The pair soon see Peg Leg Pete speed by in the car and they chase after him, Mickey driving a motorcycle and Donald riding in a sidecar. Despite Pete's evasive maneuvers he is unable to escape from Mickey and Donald, and they eventually follow him to his hideout in an abandoned sawmill.

Inside, Pete chains Fifi to the wall and grabs a submachine gun. Mickey and Donald follow Pete into the sawmill and hold him at gunpoint. The film is filled with various gags showing the two law men as bumbling and incompetent, yet at every turn they are able to stay ahead of Pete, but not capture him.

Finally, while Mickey and Donald are standing on a log, Pete activates a circular saw positioned to cut the log. Mickey and Donald run to stay ahead of the blade, but eventually the end of the log comes and the saw blade shakes loose and spins out of control. The blade proves a threat for all three of the characters, but eventually Pete gets his peg leg caught in the blade's arbor hole and brings it to a stop. Mickey and Donald restrain him with a corset, and they march Pete off to jail, accompanied by the instrumental "The Girl I Left Behind" with the now-free Fifi angrily barking at him.

Releases
1934 – Original theatrical release
c. 1992 – Mickey's Mouse Tracks, episode #28 (TV)
c. 1992 – Donald's Quack Attack, episode #54 (TV)
1998 – The Ink and Paint Club, episode #1.32: "Goin' to the Dogs" (TV)

Home media
The short was released on December 2, 2002 on Walt Disney Treasures: Mickey Mouse in Black and White.

See also
Mickey Mouse (film series)

References

External links
The Dognapper at the Disney Film Project

1934 animated films
1930s Disney animated short films
1930s crime comedy films
Mickey Mouse short films
American crime comedy films
American buddy cop films
1930s police comedy films
Films directed by David Hand
Films produced by Walt Disney
Films scored by Frank Churchill
American black-and-white films
1934 films
1930s buddy films
1934 short films
1934 comedy films
1930s American films
1930s English-language films